In statistics, the jackknife (jackknife cross-validation) is a cross-validation technique and, therefore, a form of resampling.
It is especially useful for bias and variance estimation. The jackknife pre-dates other common resampling methods such as the bootstrap. Given a sample of size , a jackknife estimator can be built by aggregating the parameter estimates from each subsample of size  obtained by omitting one observation.

The jackknife technique was developed by Maurice Quenouille (1924–1973) from 1949 and refined in 1956. John Tukey expanded on the technique in 1958 and proposed the name "jackknife" because, like a physical jack-knife (a compact folding knife), it is a rough-and-ready tool that can improvise a solution for a variety of problems even though specific problems may be more efficiently solved with a purpose-designed tool.

The jackknife is a linear approximation of the bootstrap.

A simple example: Mean estimation
The jackknife estimator of a parameter is found by systematically leaving out each observation from a dataset and calculating the parameter estimate over the remaining observations and then aggregating these calculations. 

For example, if the parameter to be estimated is the population mean of random variable , then for a given set of i.i.d. observations  the natural estimator is the sample mean:

where the last sum used another way to indicate that the index  runs over the set .

Then we proceed as follows: For each  we compute the mean  of the jackknife subsample consisting of all but the -th data point, and this is called the -th jackknife replicate:

It could help to think that these  jackknife replicates  give us an approximation of the distribution of the sample mean  and the larger the  the better this approximation will be. Then finally to get the jackknife estimator we take the average of these  jackknife replicates:

For the special case of the mean, one can show explicitly that the jackknife estimate equals the usual estimate:

This establishes the identity . Then taking expectations we get , so  is unbiased, while taking variance we get . However, these properties do not hold in general for other parameters than the mean.

This simple example for the case of mean estimation is just to illustrate the construction of a jackknife estimator, while the real subtleties (and the usefulness) emerge for the case of estimating other parameters, such as higher moments than the mean or other functionals of the distribution.

A jackknife estimate of the variance of  can be calculated from the variance of the jackknife replicates :

The left equality defines the estimator  and the right equality is an identity that can be verified directly.

Estimating the bias of an estimator
The jackknife technique can be used to estimate (and correct) the bias of an estimator calculated over the entire sample.

In this kind of situation the jackknife resampling technique may be of help.

We construct the jackknife replicates:

where each replicate is a "leave-one-out" estimate based on the jackknife subsample consisting of all but one of the data points:

Then we define their average:

Estimating the variance of an estimator
The jackknife technique can be also used to estimate the variance of an estimator calculated over the entire sample.

See also 
 Leave-one-out error

Literature 
 
 
 
 
 
 
 
 
 
 
 Shao, J. and Tu, D. (1995). The Jackknife and Bootstrap. Springer-Verlag, Inc.

Notes

References
 
 
 
 
 
 

Computational statistics
Resampling (statistics)